Marta García Martín (born 13 July 2000) is a Spanish chess player, who achieved the FIDE International Master qualification in 2019. She currently belongs to the C.A. Mislata Lanjarón Discema team from Mislata, Valencia. Garcia was the No. 4 ranked Spanish female player as of September 2018.

References

External links 
 
 
 

2000 births
Living people
Spanish chess players
Chess International Masters
Chess woman grandmasters